Petras Auštrevičius (born 16 May 1963) is a Lithuanian liberal politician, diplomat, civil society activist, former member of Seimas, and since 2014, a member of the European Parliament.

Education
In 1981, Auštrevičius graduated from Vilnius Secondary School No. 39. Afterwards, he continued his studies at Vilnius University in the Faculty of Economics, where he received a degree in Economics in 1986. He then worked as a Junior Research Fellow at the Institute of Economics, located at the Lithuanian Academy of Sciences, from 1988 to 1991. From 1992 to 1993, Auštrevičius pursued a diplomat-training program at the Hoover Institution at the Stanford University in California.

Professional career
From 1991 to 1992, Auštrevičius worked as a Senior Specialist and was the First Secretary in the Ministry of Foreign Affairs (Lithuania). He was subsequently appointed as the Head of the Nordic States Division for the Ministry of Foreign Affairs, where he served from 1992 to 1993. In 1993, Auštrevičius became a Chargé d'Affaires ad Interim of the Republic of Lithuania to the Republic of Finland, a position he held until 1994. From 1994 to 1997, he served as Lithuania's Ambassador to Finland, and at the age of 31, became the youngest ambassador in Lithuanian history.

Following this placement, he worked as Adviser to the Prime Minister on Foreign Policy. Auštrevičius then became the Director General for the European Committee under the Government of the Republic of Lithuania in 1998, after which he acted as Chancellor in the Office of the Government from 1999 to 2000.

In 2000, he was appointed as an Ambassador at Large at the Ministry of Foreign Affairs. Afterwards, in 2001, Auštrevičius worked as a Chief Negotiator for Lithuania's Membership of the European Union.

From 2000 to 2003, he held the position of Director General at European Committee under the Government of the Republic of Lithuania, later serving as a lecturer at the Institute of International Relations and Political Science at Vilnius University from 2003 to 2004.

In 2004, Auštrevičius became a Deputy Chancellor of the Government for European Union Affairs.

Political career

Member of the Lithuanian Parliament (2004–2014)
During a span of ten years (2004-2014), Auštrevičius was a member of Seimas (Lithuanian Parliament), where he served three terms until his election to the European Parliament in 2014.

Auštrevičius vigorously involved himself with Lithuanian foreign affairs and foreign policy fields, where he worked to develop Lithuania's relations with the EU. Initially, he served as the Deputy Speaker of the Board of the Seimas, the Deputy Chair at Committee on European Affairs, and a member of the Committee on Foreign Affairs. In addition to these positions, he acted as members of the Commission on the Problems of the Ignalina Nuclear Power Plant, the Commission for NATO Affairs, and the Conference of Chairs, also serving as Deputy Chair of the Seimas Delegation to the NATO Parliamentary Assembly.

Regarding his political affiliation, Auštrevičius was a member of the Liberal and Centre Union of Lithuania. However, in 2006, he co-founded the Liberals Movement of Lithuania, and from 2006 to 2008, served as its chairman.

Member of the European Parliament (2014–present)
In the 2014 European elections, Auštrevičius was elected as a member of European Parliament. At the European Parliament he serves on the Committee on Foreign Affairs (AFET) and is chairing the delegation for relations with Afghanistan for his second term already. 

Petras Auštrevičius is European Parliament's standing rapporteur for Belarus (since 2019). 

Since 2019 Mr Auštrevičius acts as a coordinator for the Renew Europe group in the EP Subcommittee on Security and Defence (SEDE) and is a substitute member for the EP Committee on Transport and Tourism (TRAN). He is a chairman of the Working Group on Companion Animals at the EP's Intergroup on the Welfare and Conservation of Animals.

2014-2019 term

He was appointed as vice-president of the ALDE (Group of the Alliance of Liberals and Democrats for Europe) political faction for the period 2014–2017. Auštrevičius was acting as a coordinator for ALDE in the Subcommittee on Human Rights (DROI). In addition to these positions, he was a substitute member for each the Committee on Regional Development (REGI), Committee of Inquiry to investigate alleged contraventions and maladministration in the application of Union law in relation to money laundering, tax avoidance and tax evasion (PANA), the Delegation to the EU-Moldova Parliamentary Cooperation Committee, and the Delegation to the Euronest Parliamentary Assembly. Petras Auštrevičius was European Parliament's standing rapporteur on Moldova. 

As a member of the Committee on Foreign Affairs, Auštrevičius was charged with assessing the European Union Association Agreement with Moldova for the Parliament.

In 2015, news media reported that Auštrevičius was included in a Russian blacklist of prominent people from the European Union who are not allowed to enter the country.

Awards
 Cross of Commander of the Order of the Lithuanian Grand Duke Gediminas (1998)
 Medal to commemorate Lithuania's membership of the EU and NATO (2004)
 Order of Honor of Georgia (2013)
 Order of Merit of Ukraine, Third Class (2015)

Other Activities
 European Endowment for Democracy (EED), Member of the Board of Governors
 IGroup of Friends in Support of Democracy in Cambodia, Founder and Chairman (since 2017)
 Institute of Liberal Thought, Co-founder 
 Lithuanian Free Market Institute, Co-founder

Auštrevičius is the initiator and supporter of the public movement Knowledge Economy Forum and People for Animals.

In 2005, he co-founded and served as a president of a discussion Europos Klubas (English: European Club) at Seimas, founded Vilnius University Alumni Society of the Faculty of Economics.

In December 2014, Auštrevičius founded the EU Informal Group "Friends of European Ukraine" in the European Parliament. He is the current co-chair that represents the European Parliament, and chairs together with Ivanna Klympush-Tsintsadze and Ostap Semerak on the side of Ukraine. Is a member of the board of the public organization 'Union of European Federalists in Lithuania'.

Publications
 Rinkos Ekonomika ir Valstybės Reguliavimas (Market Economy and State Regulation)
 Šiuolaikinių Ekonomikos Terminų Enciklopedinis Žodynas (Encyclopedic Dictionary of Modern Economic Terms)
 Lithuania's Road to the European Union: Unification of Europe and Lithuania's EU Accession Negotiation, The Accession Story – The EU from Fifteen to Twenty-five Countries
 Co-author of 10 brochures; author of press articles

References

1963 births
Living people
Members of the Seimas
Ambassadors of Lithuania to Finland
MEPs for Lithuania 2014–2019
MEPs for Lithuania 2019–2024
Liberal Movement (Lithuania) MEPs
Vilnius University alumni
Commander's Crosses of the Order of the Lithuanian Grand Duke Gediminas
Recipients of the Order of Merit (Ukraine), 3rd class